Ryan Andrews (born October 10, 1981) is a Welsh film director. He is best known for directing the films Elfie Hopkins, Hiraeth and music videos for Charli XCX, Olivia Holt and numerous pop artists.

Career 

Andrews grew up in New Quay, Ceredigion, Wales. He studied fine art in Carmarthen, before moving to London to study at the London Film School. He graduated in 2005 with an MA in Filmmaking.

After leaving London Film School, Andrews began working as a production designer. He carried out this role for Canadian film Gangster Exchange, which was released in 2009 and won multiple awards from film festivals.

In 2009, Andrews directed the short film Family Picnic for the BBC's "It's My Shout", an initiative that produces short films with budding Welsh filmmakers. He won the "It's My Shout" award for best director. In 2011, he directed Little Munchkin, a short film in which a couple adopt a cannibalistic child. The short was screened at FrightFest.

In 2010, Andrews directed a short film titled Jerusalem. It is named for the work of the same name by artist William Blake, and is based on an unsuccessful exhibit held by the artist in Soho, London in 1809. The short examines how Blake was largely unrecognized and criticized during his time. Jerusalem stars Ray Winstone as William Blake, and Amanda Drew as his wife Catherine Blake. The screenplay was written by Philippa Goslett.

Andrews directed a mini-series titled BeastHunters in 2010, which premiered on BBC Comedy upon its online launch. It stars James Corden, Jaime Winstone, and Robert Llewellyn.

Andrews' first feature film, Elfie Hopkins, was theatrically released in 2012 in the UK. It was released in the US in 2013 under the alternative title of Elfie Hopkins: Cannibal Hunter. Elfie Hopkins is a horror film surrounding a young aspiring detective who investigates her cannibalistic neighbors. For the film, Andrews chose to expand on the theme of cannibalism from his previous short film Little Munchkin. It was also inspired by Andrews' childhood dream of being a vampire hunter. The film stars Jaime Winstone and her father Ray Winstone. It was filmed in Ceredigion, Wales, where Andrews grew up.

Andrews has directed an upcoming science fiction short film titled Hiraeth. Work on the film began in 2019, and it is currently in post-production. The film was written by Stephen Laughton, and is being produced by Liv Edmunds. It is being released by Laughton and Edmunds's film production company TheMACHINE, of which Andrews is an associate. Hiraeth stars Olivia Ross and Jonathan Forbes, and tells the fictional story of a crewed mission to Europa.

Andrews has directed various music videos for different musicians throughout his career. His most frequent collaborator has been Charli XCX, for whom he has directed ten music videos in total. After being approached by Warner Bros. and Atlantic Records, Andrews worked as Charli's visual director for several years—directing the music videos associated with her album True Romance. He has described his work with Charli as "taking Tumblr and internet art to the mainstream". Andrews has also directed music videos for Banks, Transviolet, Olivia Holt, Martine McCutcheon, and Jetta, among others. He directed the visuals for Little Mix's 2017 Glory Days tour.

Filmography

Feature films 
Director
 Elfie Hopkins (2012)

Production designer

Short films 
Director

Television 
Director

Music videos
Director

References

1981 births
Living people
People from Ceredigion
Alumni of the London Film School
Welsh film directors
British music video directors
British production designers